The 1984–85 season was Colchester United's 43rd season in their history and fourth consecutive season in fourth tier of English football, the Fourth Division. Alongside competing in the Fourth Division, the club also participated in the FA Cup, the League Cup and the Associate Members' Cup.

Once again, Colchester finished high in the Fourth Division table, but ten points off promotion. Remarkably, the U's were paired against Gillingham in all three cup competitions they participated in, but only succeeded in beating them once, failing to defeat them in the first round of the League Cup and second round of the FA Cup, but won over two legs in the Associate Members' Cup.

Season overview
Despite chairman Maurice Cadman announcing the removal of win bonuses for the season, only three of the eight out-of-contract players chose to move on despite the new scheme. Steve Wignall however decided to leave for Brentford.

Colchester were paired with Gillingham in the first round of the League Cup, where they were beaten 5–2 over two legs. The U's were then drawn against them in the second round of the FA Cup after seeing off Southend United in the Essex derby following a replay. Again, Gillingham won, on this occasion scoring five in a single match and inflicting the heaviest ever home defeat on Colchester.

In-form forward Tony Adcock continued his scoring form, with 28 goals to his name by January. However, with Liverpool rumoured to be interested in signing him and Bobby Hunt's 38-goal record in sight, he suffered a serious knee injury which ruled him out for almost the remainder of the season.

Once more Colchester fell just short of promotion in seventh place, but ten points adrift of automatic promotion in fourth position. The club equalled its record away win with a 5–1 victory at Exeter City on 23 March.

Meanwhile, Maurice Cadman found a new buyer for the club, with Jonathan Crisp paying the £150,000 asking price. He promised Second Division football within five years, but in light of the Bradford City stadium fire on 11 May, a move away from the timber-constructed Layer Road stands meant fabricating a move away or redevelopment of the stadium was of utmost importance.

Players

Transfers

In

 Total spending:  ~ £0

Out

 Total incoming:  ~ £0

Loans in

Match details

Fourth Division

Results round by round

League table

Matches

League Cup

FA Cup

Associate Members' Cup

Squad statistics

Appearances and goals

|-
!colspan="16"|Players who appeared for Colchester who left during the season

|}

Goalscorers

Disciplinary record

Clean sheets
Number of games goalkeepers kept a clean sheet.

Player debuts
Players making their first-team Colchester United debut in a fully competitive match.

See also
List of Colchester United F.C. seasons

References

General
Books

Websites

Specific

1984-85
English football clubs 1984–85 season